War on 45 is an eight-song 12" EP released by the hardcore band D.O.A. in 1982. It was re-released in 2005 on CD with an additional eleven songs, but without the composition "Let's Fuck," for a total of eighteen tracks. The original cover has "MARCH INTO THE 80'S" written on it, while the 2005 version reads "MARCH TO THE END."

Track listing
All songs written by Joey Shithead, except where noted.

Original 1982 EP
 "Liar for Hire"
 "I'm Right, You're Wrong"
 "America the Beautiful"
 "Let's Fuck" (remake of the Chris Montez song "Let's Dance", covered on the first Ramones LP)
 "War" (cover of the Temptations song)
 "I Hate You"
 "War in the East"
 "Class War" (Dils cover)

2005 CD Re-release
 "Liar For Hire"
 "I'm Right, You're Wrong"
 "America the Beautiful"
 "War" (The Temptations cover)
 "I Hate You"
 "War in the East"
 "Class War" (Kinman)
 "World War 3" (Shithead, Chuck Biscuits) 
 "Smash the State"
 "Masters of War" (Bob Dylan cover)
 "Earache"
 "Eve of Destruction" (P. F. Sloan cover)
 "We Don't Need No God Damn War"
 "Warmonger"
 "Bombs Away" (Goble) 
 "World Falls Apart"
 "Fortunate Son" (Creedence Clearwater Revival cover)
 "No God No War"

Personnel
Joey "Shithead" Keithley – singer, guitarist
Dave Gregg – guitarist
Ken "Dimwit" Montgomery – drums
Brian "Wimpy Roy" Goble – bass

References

External links
The official D.O.A. website

1982 EPs
2005 EPs
D.O.A. (band) albums
Alternative Tentacles EPs